D.Hirehal is a village in Anantapur district of the Indian state of Andhra Pradesh. It is the headquarters of D. Hirehal mandal in Kalyandurg revenue division. It is part of Rayadurg Assembly constituency.

Demographics 

 census, had a population of 8,996. The total population constitutes 4,567 males and 4,429 females —a sex ratio of 970 females per 1000 males. 1,187 children are in the age group of 0–6 years, of which 627 are boys and 560 are girls —a ratio of 893 per 1000. The average literacy rate stands at 70.89% with 4,647 literates, significantly higher than the state average of 67.41%.

References 

Villages in Anantapur district
Mandal headquarters in Anantapur district